The speaker of the United States House of Representatives is the presiding officer of the United States House of Representatives. The office was established in 1789 by Article I, Section 2 of the U.S. Constitution. The speaker is the political and parliamentary leader of the House, and is simultaneously the body's presiding officer, the de facto leader of the body's majority party, and the institution's administrative head. Speakers also perform various administrative and procedural functions, all in addition to representing their own congressional district. Given these several roles and responsibilities, the speaker usually does not personally preside over debates. That duty is instead delegated to members of the House from the majority party. Neither does the speaker regularly participate in floor debates. Additionally, the speaker is second in the presidential line of succession, after the vice president and ahead of the president pro tempore of the Senate.

The House elects a new speaker by roll call vote when it first convenes after a general election for its two-year term, or when a speaker dies, resigns or is removed from the position intra-term. A majority of votes cast (as opposed to a majority of the full membership of the House) is necessary to elect a speaker. If no candidate receives a majority vote, then the roll call is repeated until a speaker is elected. The Constitution does not require the speaker to be an incumbent member of the House, although every speaker thus far has been.

Altogether, 55 individuals, from 23 states, have served as speaker of the House. The office is currently held by Kevin McCarthy following the outcome of the 2023 speaker election conducted at the start of the 118th Congress.

List of speakers 
The House has elected a speaker 128 times since 1789: at the start of each of the 118 congresses, plus on 10 occasions when a vacancy arose during a Congress via death or resignation. Of the 55 people who have served as speaker of the House over the past  years, 32 served multiple terms, and seven of them served nonconsecutive terms: Frederick Muhlenberg, Henry Clay, John W. Taylor, Thomas Brackett Reed, Joseph W. Martin Jr., Sam Rayburn, and Nancy Pelosi. Altogether, there have been 64 occasions on which a new speaker took office. Every speaker of the House has been a member of a political party or faction; the number affiliated with each is:

Notes

See also 
 List of Speaker of the United States House of Representatives elections
 List of current presidents of legislatures, presiding officers of legislative assemblies worldwide
 History of the United States House of Representatives

References

Further reading 
 
 House Document 108–204 – The Cannon Centenary Conference: The Changing Nature of the Speakership

External links 
 Official website

 
House
Speakers